The 1999 Texas A&M Aggies baseball team represented Texas A&M University in the 1999 NCAA Division I baseball season. The Aggies played their home games at Olsen Field. The team was coached by Mark Johnson in his 9th year at Texas A&M.

The Aggies won the College Station Regional and the College Station Super Regional to advance to the College World Series, where they were defeated by the Cal State Fullerton Titans.

Roster

Schedule 

! style="" | Regular Season: 45–11
|- valign="top" 

|- align="center" bgcolor="#ddffdd"
| 1 || February 5 ||  || No. 17 || Olsen Field • College Station, Texas || W 12–2 || 1–0 || –
|- align="center" bgcolor="#ddffdd"
| 2 || February 6 || Texas–Pan American || No. 17 || Olsen Field • College Station, Texas || W 15–1 || 2–0 || –
|- align="center" bgcolor="#ddffdd"
| 3 || February 6 || Texas–Pan American || No. 17 || Olsen Field • College Station, Texas || W 21–5 || 3–0 || –
|- align="center" bgcolor="#ffdddd"
| 4 || February 12 || at No. 21 Arizona || No. 15 || Jerry Kindall Field at Frank Sancet Stadium • Tucson, Arizona || L 5–11 || 3–1 || –
|- align="center" bgcolor="#ffdddd"
| 5 || February 13 || at No. 21 Arizona || No. 15 || Jerry Kindall Field at Frank Sancet Stadium • Tucson, Arizona || L 2–5 || 3–2 || –
|- align="center" bgcolor="#ddffdd"
| 6 || February 14 || at No. 21 Arizona || No. 15 || Jerry Kindall Field at Frank Sancet Stadium • Tucson, Arizona || W 18–9 || 4–2 || –
|- align="center" bgcolor="#ddffdd"
| 7 || February 16 ||  || No. 17 || Olsen Field • College Station, Texas || W 11–4 || 5–2 || –
|- align="center" bgcolor="#ddffdd"
| 8 || February 20 ||  || No. 17 || Olsen Field • College Station, Texas || W 8–0 || 6–2 || –
|- align="center" bgcolor="#ddffdd"
| 9 || February 20 || UT Arlington || No. 17 || Olsen Field • College Station, Texas || W 12–0 || 7–2 || –
|- align="center" bgcolor="#ddffdd"
| 10 || February 21 || UT Arlington || No. 17 || Olsen Field • College Station, Texas || W 7–1 || 8–2 || –
|- align="center" bgcolor="#ddffdd"
| 11 || February 23 || at  || No. 12 || Holleman Field • Huntsville, Texas || W 7–3 || 9–2 || –
|- align="center" bgcolor="#ddffdd"
| 12 || February 26 || No. 13 Oklahoma State || No. 12 || Olsen Field • College Station, Texas || W 5–3 || 10–2 || 1–0
|- align="center" bgcolor="#ddffdd"
| 13 || February 27 || No. 13 Oklahoma State || No. 12 || Olsen Field • College Station, Texas || W 7–4 || 11–2 || 2–0
|- align="center" bgcolor="#ddffdd"
| 14 || February 28 || No. 13 Oklahoma State || No. 12 || Olsen Field • College Station, Texas || W 4–3 || 12–2 || 3–0
|-

|- align="center" bgcolor="#ffdddd"
| 15 || March 2 || at  || No. 7 || Roadrunner Field • San Antonio, Texas || L 9–10 || 12–3 || –
|- align="center" bgcolor="#ddffdd"
| 16 || March 5 ||  || No. 7 || Olsen Field • College Station, Texas || W 8–3 || 13–3 || 4–0
|- align="center" bgcolor="#ddffdd"
| 17 || March 6 || Iowa State || No. 7 || Olsen Field • College Station, Texas || W 6–1 || 14–3 || 5–0
|- align="center" bgcolor="#ddffdd"
| 18 || March 7 || Iowa State || No. 7 || Olsen Field • College Station, Texas || W 14–1 || 15–3 || 6–0
|- align="center" bgcolor="#ddffdd"
| 19 || March 9 || at  || No. 6 || Cougar Field • Houston, Texas || W 8–7 || 16–3 || –
|- align="center" bgcolor="#ffdddd"
| 20 || March 14 || at No. 21  || No. 6 || Dan Law Field • Lubbock, Texas || L 4–5 || 16–4 || 6–1
|- align="center" bgcolor="#ffdddd"
| 21 || March 14 || at No. 21 Texas Tech || No. 6 || Dan Law Field • Lubbock, Texas || L 1–9 || 16–5 || 6–2
|- align="center" bgcolor="#ddffdd"
| 22 || March 17 || at Southwest Texas State || No. 11 || Bobcat Field • San Marcos, Texas || W 13–4 || 17–5 || –
|- align="center" bgcolor="#ffdddd"
| 23 || March 19 ||  || No. 11 || Olsen Field • College Station, Texas || L 3–14 || 17–6 || –
|- align="center" bgcolor="#ddffdd"
| 24 || March 20 ||  || No. 11 || Olsen Field • College Station, Texas || W 6–4 || 18–6 || –
|- align="center" bgcolor="#ddffdd"
| 25 || March 20 ||  || No. 11 || Olsen Field • College Station, Texas || W 7–0 || 19–6 || –
|- align="center" bgcolor="#ddffdd"
| 26 || March 21 || Michigan || No. 11 || Olsen Field • College Station, Texas || W 8–2 || 20–6 || –
|- align="center" bgcolor="#ddffdd"
| 27 || March 22 || Cal State Northridge || No. 16 || Olsen Field • College Station, Texas || W 12–9 || 21–6 || –
|- align="center" bgcolor="#ddffdd"
| 28 || March 22 || UNLV || No. 16 || Olsen Field • College Station, Texas || W 5–4 || 22–6 || –
|- align="center" bgcolor="#ddffdd"
| 29 || March 24 ||  || No. 16 || Olsen Field • College Station, Texas || W 7–2 || 23–6 || –
|- align="center" bgcolor="#ddffdd"
| 30 || March 26 || at  || No. 16 || Simmons Field • Columbia, Missouri || W 2–1 || 24–6 || 7–2
|- align="center" bgcolor="#ffdddd"
| 31 || March 27 || at Missouri || No. 16 || Simmons Field • Columbia, Missouri || L 8–12 || 24–7 || 7–3
|- align="center" bgcolor="#ddffdd"
| 32 || March 28 || at Missouri || No. 16 || Simmons Field • Columbia, Missouri || W 6–3 || 25–7 || 8–3
|- align="center" bgcolor="#ffdddd"
| 33 || March 30 || at No. 9  || No. 17 || Cameron Field • Houston, Texas || L 6–7 || 25–8 || –
|-

|- align="center" bgcolor="#ddffdd"
| 34 || April 2 || No. 19  || No. 17 || Olsen Field • College Station, Texas || W 14–4 || 26–8 || 9–3
|- align="center" bgcolor="#ddffdd"
| 35 || April 3 || No. 19 Nebraska || No. 17 || Olsen Field • College Station, Texas || W 16–5 || 27–8 || 10–3
|- align="center" bgcolor="#ddffdd"
| 36 || April 3 || No. 19 Nebraska || No. 17 || Olsen Field • College Station, Texas || W 3–2 || 28–8 || 11–3
|- align="center" bgcolor="#ddffdd"
| 37 || April 6 || Sam Houston State || No. 12 || Olsen Field • College Station, Texas || W 15–4 || 29–8 || –
|- align="center" bgcolor="#ddffdd"
| 38 || April 9 || at  || No. 12 || KSU Baseball Stadium • Manhattan, Kansas || W 3–0 || 30–8 || 12–3
|- align="center" bgcolor="#ddffdd"
| 39 || April 10 || at Kansas State || No. 12 || KSU Baseball Stadium • Manhattan, Kansas || W 15–3 || 31–8 || 13–3
|- align="center" bgcolor="#ddffdd"
| 40 || April 11 || at Kansas State || No. 12 || KSU Baseball Stadium • Manhattan, Kansas || W 7–2 || 32–8 || 14–3
|- align="center" bgcolor="#ddffdd"
| 41 || April 13 || UTSA || No. 12 || Olsen Field • College Station, Texas || W 12–11 || 33–8 || 14–3
|- align="center" bgcolor="#ffdddd"
| 42 || April 16 || at No. 8  || No. 12 || Baylor Ballpark • Waco, Texas || L 2–7 || 33–9 || 14–4
|- align="center" bgcolor="#ddffdd"
| 43 || April 17 || at No. 8 Baylor || No. 12 || Baylor Ballpark • Waco, Texas || W 5–4 || 34–9 || 15–4
|- align="center" bgcolor="#ddffdd"
| 44 || April 18 || at No. 8 Baylor || No. 12 || Baylor Ballpark • Waco, Texas || W 11–10 || 35–9 || 16–4
|- align="center" bgcolor="#ddffdd"
| 45 || April 19 ||  || No. 7 || Olsen Field • College Station, Texas || W 7–2 || 36–9 || –
|- align="center" bgcolor="#ddffdd"
| 46 || April 20 || Houston || No. 7 || Olsen Field • College Station, Texas || W 15–5 || 37–9 || –
|- align="center" bgcolor="#ddffdd"
| 47 || April 23 ||  || No. 7 || Olsen Field • College Station, Texas || W 8–1 || 38–9 || 17–4
|- align="center" bgcolor="#ddffdd"
| 48 || April 24 || Kansas || No. 7 || Olsen Field • College Station, Texas || W 12–5 || 39–9 || 18–4
|- align="center" bgcolor="#ddffdd"
| 49 || April 25 || Kansas || No. 7 || Olsen Field • College Station, Texas || W 10–3 || 40–9 || 19–4
|- align="center" bgcolor="#ddffdd"
| 50 || April 27 || Sam Houston State || No. 6 || Olsen Field • College Station, Texas || W 14–10 || 41–9 || –
|- align="center" bgcolor="#ffdddd"
| 51 || April 30 || No. 20  || No. 6 || Olsen Field • College Station, Texas || L 6–18 || 41–10 || 19–5
|-

|- align="center" bgcolor="#ddffdd"
| 52 || May 1 || at No. 20 Texas || No. 6 || Disch–Falk Field • Austin, Texas || W 10–6 || 42–10 || 20–5
|- align="center" bgcolor="#ddffdd"
| 53 || May 2 || at No. 20 Texas || No. 6 || Disch–Falk Field • Austin, Texas || W 10–1 || 43–10 || 21–5
|- align="center" bgcolor="#ddffdd"
| 54 || May 14 || at  || No. 6 || L. Dale Mitchell Baseball Park • Norman, Oklahoma || W 9–3 || 44–10 || 22–5
|- align="center" bgcolor="#ffdddd"
| 55 || May 15 || at Oklahoma || No. 6 || L. Dale Mitchell Baseball Park • Norman, Oklahoma || L 12–13 || 44–11 || 22–6
|- align="center" bgcolor="#ddffdd"
| 56 || May 16 || at Oklahoma || No. 6 || L. Dale Mitchell Baseball Park • Norman, Oklahoma || W 9–5 || 45–11 || 23–6
|-

|-
|-
! style="" | Postseason: 8–6
|- valign="top"

|- align="center" bgcolor="#ffdddd"
| 57 || May 19 || vs. (8) Oklahoma || (1) No. 6 || Bricktown Ballpark • Oklahoma City, Oklahoma || L 5–10 || 45–12 || 0–1
|- align="center" bgcolor="#ddffdd"
| 58 || May 20 || vs. (4) No. 17 Oklahoma State || (1) No. 6 || Bricktown Ballpark • Oklahoma City, Oklahoma || W 4–2 || 46–12 || 1–1
|- align="center" bgcolor="#ddffdd"
| 59 || May 21 || vs. (8) Oklahoma || (1) No. 6 || Bricktown Ballpark • Oklahoma City, Oklahoma || W 10–3 || 47–12 || 2–1
|- align="center" bgcolor="#ffdddd"
| 60 || May 22 || vs. (5) No. 24 Nebraska || (1) No. 6 || Bricktown Ballpark • Oklahoma City, Oklahoma || L 7–8 || 47–13 || 2–2
|-

|- align="center" bgcolor="#ddffdd"
| 61 || May 28 || (4)  || (1) No. 6 || Olsen Field • College Station, Texas || W 6–0 || 48–13 || 1–0
|- align="center" bgcolor="#ffdddd"
| 62 || May 29 || (2) No. 29  || (1) No. 6 || Olsen Field • College Station, Texas || L 5–7 || 48–14 || 1–1
|- align="center" bgcolor="#ddffdd"
| 63 || May 29 || (3)  || (1) No. 6 || Olsen Field • College Station, Texas || W 13–7 || 49–14 || 2–1
|- align="center" bgcolor="#ddffdd"
| 64 || May 30 || (2) No. 29 Long Beach State || (1) No. 6 || Olsen Field • College Station, Texas || W 9–5 || 50–14 || 3–1
|- align="center" bgcolor="#ddffdd"
| 65 || May 30 || (2) No. 29 Long Beach State || (1) No. 6 || Olsen Field • College Station, Texas || W 17–7 || 51–14 || 4–1
|-

|- align="center" bgcolor="#ddffdd"
| 66 || June 4 || No. 12 Clemson || (7) No. 6 || Olsen Field • College Station, Texas || W 20–3 || 52–14 || 5–1
|- align="center" bgcolor="#ffdddd"
| 67 || June 5 || No. 12 Clemson || (7) No. 6 || Olsen Field • College Station, Texas || L 3–10 || 52–15 || 5–2
|- align="center" bgcolor="#ddffdd"
| 68 || June 6 || No. 12 Clemson || (7) No. 6 || Olsen Field • College Station, Texas || W 5–4 || 53–15 || 6–2
|-

|- align="center" bgcolor="#ffdddd"
| 69 || June 12 || vs. (2) No. 3 Florida State || (7) No. 6 || Johnny Rosenblatt Stadium • Omaha, Nebraska || L 3–7 || 53–16 || 0–1
|- align="center" bgcolor="#ffdddd"
| 70 || June 14 || vs. (3) No. 4  || (7) No. 6 || Johnny Rosenblatt Stadium • Omaha, Nebraska || L 2–4 || 53–17 || 0–2
|-

Awards and honors 
Daylan Holt
 First Team All-Big 12 Conference

Casey Fossum
 First Team All-Big 12 Conference

Chris Russ
 Second Team All-American Collegiate Baseball Newspaper
 Third Team All-American Baseball America
 Third Team All-American National Collegiate Baseball Writers Association
 First Team All-Big 12 Conference

Steve Scarborough
 Second Team All-Big 12 Conference
 All-Big 12 Conference Tournament Team

John Scheschuk
 Second Team All-Big 12 Conference

Shawn Schumacher
 Third Team All-American National Collegiate Baseball Writers Association
 Second Team All-Big 12 Conference

Steven Truitt
 Second Team All-Big 12 Conference

References 

Texas A&M Aggies baseball seasons
Texas A&M Aggies baseball
College World Series seasons
Texas A&M
Big 12 Conference baseball champion seasons